The Croatian Volleyball Federation (HOS) is the governing body of volleyball in Croatia. It is based in Zagreb.

It organizes the following volleyball leagues:
 1A Men's Volleyball League
 1B Men's Volleyball League
 1A Women's Volleyball League
 1B Women's Volleyball League

It also organizes the Croatian national volleyball team and the Croatian national women's volleyball team. The HOS was formed in 1946. It is a member of the Fédération Internationale de Volleyball and the Confédération Européenne de Volleyball.

External links 
 Croatian Volleyball Federation

Croatia
Volleyball
Volleyball in Croatia
Sports organizations established in 1946